Igor Vitalievich Jijikine (Russian: И́горь Вита́льевич Жижи́кин; born 8 October 1965) is a Russian-American  actor working in Los Angeles and Moscow.

Early life and career

Jijikine was born in Moscow and from 1983 to 1988 he studied drama and acrobatics. From 1982 to 1984, Jijikine performed mandatory military service with the Soviet Special Forces unit Spetznaz. He performed on stage with the Moscow State Circus, Donn Arden’s "Jubilee" and Cirque du Soleil's "Mystere" in Las Vegas.

Film career
Over the recent years, Jijikine has worked with such directors as Steven Spielberg, Clint Eastwood and J. J. Abrams and has appeared in numerous commercial spots for major brands.  In Steven Spielberg's Indiana Jones and the Kingdom of the Crystal Skull, Igor plays the role of Colonel Dovchenko (taking over the series' tough guy role held by the late Pat Roach), the ruthless leader of the Soviet commando team searching for the crystal skull. His commercially most successful films have been Indiana Jones and the Kingdom of the Crystal Skull which grossed US$786 million and The Tourist which grossed US$278 million worldwide.

Computer games
Jijikine appeared in the real-time strategy games, Emperor: Battle for Dune, Red Alert 2 and its expansion Yuri's Revenge, by Westwood Studios. In addition to appearing in the games' cutscene sequences, he modeled as a Soviet soldier appearing in the front cover of Red Alert 2.

Sports
Igor is an accomplished sportsman and was honored as Master of Sports in Russia.

Filmography

References

External links
 
 
 Igor Jijikine on Kino-Teatr.Ru

1965 births
Living people
Russian male film actors
Russian male television actors
Russian male voice actors
Male actors from Moscow
Russian emigrants to the United States